Cadbury Castle  may refer to:

Cadbury Castle, Devon, an Iron Age hill fort
Cadbury Castle, Somerset, an Iron Age hill fort